Key is a 2011 Telugu-language psychological thriller produced by Sukumar Reddy for Dream Theater Entertainments and directed by Nagendra Prasad. Jagapati Babu plays the lead role and the music was composed by Vijay Kurakula. The film is a remake of the English film Exam.

Plot
The film begins with a special kind of examination in a closed room with security for a notable post in a Prestigious Company. Here, 9 candidates appear, and the Invigilator explains that only one of them will be selected based on their answer to the question within 90 mins. Appealing 4 conditions if not they are disqualified.

1. The applicants should not talk with Invigilator

2. Cannot talk with Security

3. Does not leave the room

4. They may not spoil their paper either intentionally or accidentally.

Now invigilator moves by locking the room and the test begins. Then, the contenders are surprised to spot a blank paper minus the question. At the outset itself, a candidate is ineligible as he spoiled the paper writing God's name. At that point, the men are in bewilderment. Hence, they communicate no damage to rules and decide to first figure out the question with teamwork. Presently, they introduce themselves with their profession because any caste, community, numerology, or color sentiments are not forced.

1. Criminal Lawyer

2. Professor

3. Psychologist

4. Optic Engineer

5. Scientist

6. MBA Graduate

7. Business Consultant

8. Journalist

Next, the team starts breaking out the Key with their analysis and expertise in their subjects. Utilizing various methods such as lights, bodily fluids, fire sprinklers, glass pieces, etc. Meanwhile, the optic engineer is eliminated as he is torn by mistake. Plus, the MBA graduate and the Business consultant are removed from the backstabbing of the Criminal lawyer. Under his assumption that whoever is left, in the end, is the winner. In response, the Journalist strikes the Lawyer when he collapses, and also fastened. Afterward, the lawyer pleads for his medication which he has to take hourly otherwise he goes into a comma. But the ruthless Journalist disposes of it.

Currently, he targets the Psychologist as he discovers she is a previous employee of the firm and tortures her for the question. Time goes on, and the Lawyer's condition becomes worse in that precariousness the Psychologist speaks with the Invigilator and she is erased. Anyhow, the Professor stands strong & firm in every plight and recoups the medicine, and rescues the Lawyer with her wit. However, the sly Lawyer ruses by stealing the revolver of the guard and gives the ultimatum to remain to vacate the room. Since they deny he shoots the Journalist when the Scientist walks out and the Professor pretends. In the joy of the championship, the Lawyer addresses the invigilator and he is kicked out. As it happens, the Journalist also recovers because it is a dummy bullet. Ultimately, the Invigilator arrives and congratulates the Professor. At last, the Invigilator states that he doesn't give any questions. Just piloted their traits, ability, tactical, and crisis management skills. Finally, the movie ends with the Invigilator who is CEO too appointing the Professor.

Cast
Jagapati Babu as Invigilator   
 Swapna as Candidate 9
 Sampath as Sampahmu
 Sukumar as Moyee
 Deepthi as Vajpayee
 Altaf as Meerza
 Dhanunjay
 Sonia
 Key Williams as Maleek
 Chinna as Rajju
 Narasimha
 Raj as Kiran

Soundtrack

References

2011 films
2010s Telugu-language films
Indian remakes of British films
Indian psychological thriller films
Indian psychological drama films